Matthew Weeks (born 4 October 1982) is an Australian cricketer. He played in two first-class and six List A matches for South Australia between 2004 and 2009.

See also
 List of South Australian representative cricketers

References

External links
 

1982 births
Living people
Australian cricketers
South Australia cricketers
Cricketers from Adelaide